Gerald Charles Wainwright Jr. (born February 11, 1947) is a retired American basketball coach. Wainwright served as the head men's basketball coach at the University of North Carolina at Wilmington (UNC Wilmington) from 1994 to 2002, the University of Richmond from 2002 to 2005, and DePaul University from 2005 to 2010.

Early life and education
Born in Berwyn, Illinois, Wainwright graduated from J. Sterling Morton High School West. He first attended Morton Junior College before transferring to Colorado College and played center for the Colorado College Tigers basketball team from 1966 to 1968. As a junior in 1966–67, Wainwright played in 19 games, shot 50% from the field, and averaged 10.9 points and 6.6 rebounds. In his senior season of 1967–68, Wainwright played 20 games, shot 45.6% from the field, and averaged 9.4 points and 6.3 rebounds. Wainwright completed his B.A. degree at Colorado College in 1968 and master's degree at the University of Denver in 1971.

Coaching career
Wainwright began his coaching career in 1971 as assistant coach at West Leyden High School in Northlake, Illinois in 1971. Three years later, Wainwright returned to Colorado to be head coach at Montrose High School in Montrose, Colorado. After earning Colorado District Coach of the Year in 1975, Wainwright returned to his native Illinois and became an assistant coach at East Leyden High School in Franklin Park, Illinois near Chicago. After four seasons at East Leyden, Wainwright became head coach at Highland Park High School in 1979. At Highland Park, Wainwright earned two district "coach of the year" awards and led the program to the Sweet 16 round of the state tournament in 1982.

In 1984, Wainwright got his first college coaching job as an assistant coach at Xavier under Bob Staak. Wainwright then followed Staak to Wake Forest in 1985 and remained on Dave Odom's staff at Wake Forest until the 1993–94 season.

From 1994 to 2002, Wainwright was head coach at UNC Wilmington, during which he had a 136–103 record. In his final season with UNCW, he led the Seahawks to a first-round upset of USC in the 2002 NCAA tournament.

Wainwright then became head coach at Richmond on April 24, 2002. In a three-season tenure, led Richmond to an NIT appearance in 2003 and NCAA tournament appearance in 2004.

He was the head coach at DePaul from 2005 to 2010. On November 21, 2006, Wainwright earned his 200th win as a Division I head coach in a 93-74 victory over Chaminade at the Maui Invitational. DePaul ended the 2006–07 season with 20 wins and advanced to the NIT quarterfinals. After a 7–8 start, Wainwright was fired on January 11, 2010. Wainwright then left coaching to promote charity causes in North Carolina. In 2010 and 2011, Wainwright served as an in-studio analyst for Sirius XM's Mad Dog Radio's NCAA Tournament coverage with Chris "Mad Dog" Russo.

After one season as assistant coach under Rodney Terry at Fresno State, Wainwright became director of basketball operations at Marquette in June 2012 and was later promoted to assistant coach before the season. In 2014, Wainwright re-joined Fresno State as associate head coach, again under Terry.

Head coaching record

College

References

External links
 Fresno State profile
 Marquette profile
 USA Basketball profile

1947 births
Living people
American men's basketball coaches
American men's basketball players
Basketball coaches from Illinois
Basketball players from Illinois
Centers (basketball)
College men's basketball head coaches in the United States
Colorado College Tigers men's basketball players
DePaul Blue Demons men's basketball coaches
Fresno State Bulldogs men's basketball coaches
High school basketball coaches in the United States
Junior college men's basketball players in the United States
Marquette Golden Eagles men's basketball coaches
People from Berwyn, Illinois
Richmond Spiders men's basketball coaches
Sportspeople from Cook County, Illinois
UNC Wilmington Seahawks men's basketball coaches
Wake Forest Demon Deacons men's basketball coaches
Xavier Musketeers men's basketball coaches